The New River Valley rivalry is a crosstown college sports rivalry between the Radford Highlanders of Radford University and the Virginia Tech Hokies of the Virginia Polytechnic Institute and State University. Both universities lie within the New River Valley of the Blue Ridge Mountains, and both main campuses are separated by only 12 miles.

All-time and series results 

Series led and games won by Radford are shaded ██ red. Series led and games won by Virginia Tech shaded ██ orange.

Baseball

Men's basketball

Men's soccer 

Source

Notes

References 

College sports rivalries in the United States
College sports in Virginia
Radford Highlanders
Virginia Tech Hokies
Sports rivalries in Virginia